Lazaretto Creek is a  long tributary to the Little Nottoway River in the United States state of Virginia.  Located in the south-central part of the state, it is part of the larger Chowan-Albemarle drainage.  The watershed is 51% forested and 39% agricultural with the rest of land as other uses.

See also
List of rivers of Virginia

References

Rivers of Virginia
Tributaries of Albemarle Sound